"Banjo Thing" (also known as "Banjo Thing! (Yeepeekayeah Muthafuckas)") is a song by the Danish dance-pop duo Infernal, which features former Infernal member Søren Haahr, as Red$tar, on vocals. It was released as the first single from their 2004 album From Paris to Berlin, in 2003 in Denmark. The song samples the 1994 techno song "Swamp Thing" by the English group The Grid.

Track listing

Credits and personnel
Produced, arranged and mixed by Infernal and Søren Haahr at Infernal Studio
Written by Infernal and Søren Haahr
Vocals by Søren Haahr
Banjo by Roger Dinsdale

Charts

References

2003 singles
Infernal (Danish band) songs
Songs written by Paw Lagermann
Songs written by Lina Rafn
2003 songs